Sasirekha Parinayam is a 2009 Indian Telugu-language romantic drama film directed by Krishna Vamsi and produced by Sunkara Madhumurali. The film stars Tarun and Genelia. It was one of the average grossers in Tharun's career. The film has been dubbed in Hindi as Bhagam Bhag Love and into Tamil as Sasirekhavin Kalyanam.

Plot

The independent and spirited Sasirekha (Genelia) is ordered by her father to marry an NRI. She is to see a video of the groom and his house, but stamps on it, declaring she doesn't want to get married. When the groom's father demands dowry on the wedding day, she runs away from her marriage. Soon after, she runs into Anand (Tharun). They bond well during their acquaintance and the rest of the movie is about how she falls in love with Anand. As it turns out, Anand is Abhimanyu, the one she was supposed to marry, but due to dowry disputes with his dad, the wedding party leaves without him.

Sasi tries reaching her friend in Hyderabad while escaping her relatives and finding her stolen ornaments with the help of Anand aka Abhimanyu who is deeply in love with her. On reaching Hyderabad after many adventurous events, Sasi get hit by a glass bottle during a strike. A completely teary Abhimanyu takes her to the hospital in auto and Sasi declares her love for him on the way. The climax has Sasi's family and Abhimanyu's family in the hospital where Abhimanyu makes them realise their mistakes and Sasi realises that Anand is indeed Abhimanyu. She gets very happy on knowing this and they get married and all ends well.

Cast

 Tharun as Anand / Abhimanyu
 Genelia as Sasirekha aka Sasi / (Bujjamma)
 Ahuti Prasad as Thathabbai
 Gopala Krishna as Chalasani Gopala Krishna
 Raghu Babu as Abbulu
 M. S. Narayana as A. Koti
 Noel Sean
 Subbaraju
 Suthivelu
 Sivaji Raja
 Surekha Vani
 Geetha Singh
 Tulasi
 Vamshi Paidithalli

Soundtrack

The music and background score was composed by Mani Sharma with the lyrics penned by Sirivennela Seetharama Sastry and Ananta Sriram. Music director Vidyasagar composed two songs in the album ("Yedo Yedo" and "Bujjamma").

References

External links
 

2009 films
2009 romantic comedy-drama films
2000s road comedy-drama films
Indian road comedy-drama films
Films directed by Krishna Vamsi
Films shot in Vijayawada
Films scored by Vidyasagar
Films scored by Mani Sharma
Films set in Vijayawada
2000s Telugu-language films
Indian romantic comedy-drama films
2009 comedy films
2009 drama films